Code Name: Black and White is a 1988 Filipino action comedy film directed by Gayjee Pangan and starring Chiquito, Redford White, Pinky Marquez, Beverly Vergel, Bubbles Lin, Nieves Manuel, Roy Alvarez, Paquito Diaz, Rocco Montalban and Renato del Prado. Produced by ABA Productions, the film was released on December 15, 1988.

Plot
Blacky and White is The Brothers Criminal Police syndicate of Sonny Boy

Cast
Chiquito as Blacky
Redford White as Whitey
Pinky Marquez as Pinky
Beverly Vergel as Beverly
Bubbles Lin as Bubbles
Nieves Manuel as Nieves
Angelo Ventura as Chief. Madrigal
Roy Alvarez as Sonny Boy
Paquito Diaz as Panero
Rocco Montalban
Tony Manalili
Renato del Prado
Tintoy
Vilma Fernandez
Tony Bagyo
Maning Bato

Release
Code Name: Black and White was given a "P" rating by the Movie and Television Review and Classification Board (MTRCB), which stands for "Parental Guidance Recommended," and was released on December 15, 1988.

References

External links

1988 films
1980s action comedy films
1988 comedy films
Filipino-language films
Films about police officers
Philippine action comedy films